William Salmond (9 February 1835 – 6 March 1917) was a notable New Zealand presbyterian minister, university professor and writer. He was born in Edinburgh, Midlothian, Scotland in 1835. The geologist Robin Allan was his grandson. Salmond taught theology at the University of Otago.

References

1835 births
1917 deaths
Academic staff of the University of Otago
Scottish emigrants to New Zealand
New Zealand Presbyterian ministers
William